Solute carrier organic anion transporter family member 1A2 is a protein that in humans is encoded by the SLCO1A2 gene.

This gene encodes a sodium-independent transporter which mediates cellular uptake of organic ions in the liver. Its substrates include bile acids, bromosulphophthalein, and some steroidal compounds. The protein is a member of the SLC21A family of solute carriers. Alternate splicing of this gene results in three transcript variants encoding two different isoforms.

See also
 Solute carrier family

References

Further reading

Solute carrier family